Thomas Duncan may refer to:
 Thomas Duncan (general) (1819–1887), United States Army general during the Civil War
 Thomas Duncan (Canadian politician) (died 1910), politician in Manitoba, Canada
 Thomas Duncan (painter) (1807–1845), Scottish portraitist and historical painter
 Thomas Duncan (American politician) (1893–1959), Milwaukee Socialist senator and representative
 Thomas Young Duncan (1836–1914), New Zealand Liberal Party politician
 Thomas William Duncan (1905–1987), US writer
 Thomas Eric Duncan (1972–2014), first person to die of Ebola in the United States
 Tommy Duncan (1911–1967), American musician
 Tommy Duncan (footballer) (born 1936), Scottish footballer and manager

See also